Q-School 2015 – Event 1 was the first of two qualifying tournaments for the 2015/16 snooker season that took place from 14 to 19 May 2015 at Meadowside Centre in Burton-upon-Trent, England.

The four qualifying spots were won by Sydney Wilson, Daniel Wells, Eden Sharav and Rhys Clark who beat Chen Zhe, Alexander Ursenbacher, Adam Duffy and Leo Fernandez respectively in the finals of their draw. Daniel Wells being the only winner to have previously held a tour card.

Format
The tournament consisted of 166 participants who were randomly assigned to four section start. Each section plays in the knockout system with the winner of each section earning a two-year tour card to play on the main tour for the 2015/16 snooker season and 2016/17 snooker season. All matches will be the best-of-7.

Players in the tournament consist of former professionals trying to regain their tour cards and amateurs attempting to join the main tour for the first time. Former professionals in the tournament include former world number 17 Andy Hicks as well as Alex Davies, Alexander Ursenbacher, Leo Fernandez, Ahmed Saif, Elliot Slessor, Paul Davison, Sam Craigie, Jamie O'Neill, Kacper Filipiak, Adam Duffy, Marcus Campbell, Chen Zhe, Chris Norbury, Hammad Miah and former 10-time Women's snooker champion Reanne Evans who was attempting to regain a place on the main tour for the first time since 2011. Evans and Heather Clare were the only female competitors in the tournament.

Main draw

Round 1

Best of 7 frames

Section 1

Section 2

Section 3

Section 4

References

Snooker competitions in England
Q School (snooker)
2015 in snooker
2015 in English sport
Sport in Burton upon Trent